Palvelicham is a small village near Kattikkulam town in Mananthavady area of Wayanad district, Kerala, India.

Location
Palvelicham village is located deep inside the teak forest of Wayanad.  There are many tree houses on tall teak trees. Elephant sightings are easy here but they are sometime a little dangerous.

Attractions
The main attraction is the immense Alphonsa Church with two entrances. Kuruva islands are also close by.

The U-Turn
The road to Palvelicham goes around the Alphonsa Church and comes back to the back side of the church.  The small town of Palvelicham is also on the back side of the church.

Transportation
Palvelicham can be accessed from Kattikkulam near Mananthavady. The Periya ghat road connects Mananthavady to Kannur and Thalassery.  The Thamarassery mountain road connects Calicut with Kalpetta. The Kuttiady mountain road connects Vatakara with Kalpetta and Mananthavady. The Palchuram mountain road connects Kannur and Iritty with Mananthavady.  The road from Nilambur to Ooty is also connected to Wayanad through the village of Meppadi.

The nearest railway station is at Mysore and the nearest airports are Kozhikode International Airport-120 km, Bengaluru International Airport-290 km, and   Kannur International Airport, 58 km.

Image gallery

References

Mananthavady Area